The Men's Field Hockey Olympic Qualifier for the 1996 Summer Olympics was held at the complex of Catalan sports club Real Club de Polo in Barcelona, Catalonia, Spain, from Friday January 19 to Sunday January 28, 1996. Eight nations took part, and they played a round robin. The top five teams joined Australia (Oceania Cup winner), Argentina (Pan American Games winner), Pakistan (World Cup winner), South Korea (Asian Games winner), Germany (European Nations Cup winner) and South Africa (All Africa Games winner), and the United States (hosts).

Squads

Igor Barkov
Vitali Bondarenko
Alexandre Boudnikov
Guennadi Bribovski
Youri Canja
Serguey Drozdov
Alexandre Eklemenko (gk)
Dmitri Yukovski
Stepan Klimovich
Yuri Korottchenko
Alexandre Mankovski
Nikolay Sankovets
Andrei Tchebotarev
Albert Vintekevich (c)
Igor Voltyuk
Alexandre Yukovets

Head Coach unknown

Fabian Berger
Joeri Beunen
Mick Beunen
Alexandre de Chaffoy
Marc Coudron (c)
Jean-Michel Deville
Gérald Dewamme
Philippe van Hemelen
Laurent Kelecom
Michel Kinnen
Michel van Oost (gk)
Patrick Pille
Thierry Renear
Vincent Van Diest
Bruno Vuylsteke
Jean Willems

Head Coach Alain Geens

Canada

Alan Brahmst
Patrick Burrows (c)
Paul Chohan
Robin D'Abreo
John Desouza
Rob Edamura
Adam Evans
Marek Gacek
Chris Gifford
Doug Harris
Hari Kant (gk)
Peter Milkovich
Ken Pereira
Rick Roberts
André Rousseau (gk)
Rob Short

Head Coach Shiaz Virjee

Guy Fordham
Calum Giles
Daniel Hall
Julian Halls
Simon Hazlitt
Howard Hoskin
Jason Laslett (c)
David Luckes (gk)
Simon Mason (gk)
Chris Mayer
John Shaw
Soma Singh
Kalbir Takher
Nick Thompson
Robert Thompson
Jon Wyatt

Head Coach unknown

Anil Aldrin
Edward Alloysins (gk)
Bopaiah Anjapara (gk)
Gavin Ferreira
Sandeep Hamachimana
Sanjeev Khumar
Mukesh Kumar
Dhanraj Pillay
Mohamed Riaz Nabi
Baljeet Singh Dhillon
Baljeet Singh Saini
Harpreet Singh
Ramandeep Singh
Pargat Singh (c)
Dilip Tirkey
Sabu Varkey

Head Coach Cedric D'Souza

Lim Chiow Chuan
Charles David
Calvin Fernandez
Nadarajan Marathumuthu (gk)
Maninderjt Singh
Lailin Abu Hassan
Brian Jayhan Siva
Chairil Anwar Abdul Aziz
Lum Mun Fatt
Shankar Ramu
Nor Saiful Nasiruddin (c)
Mirnawan Nawawi
Aphtar Singh
Arul Selvaraj Sami
Kuhan Shanmuganathan
Yahia Vickneswaran

Head Coach Volker Knapp

Jacques Brinkman
Maurits Crucq
Marc Delissen (c)
Jeroen Delmee
Sander van Heeswijk
Taco van den Honert
Ronald Jansen (gk)
Erik Jazet
Leo Klein Gebbink
Teun de Nooijer
Wouter van Pelt
Stephan Veen
Guus Vogels (gk)
Rogier van der Wal
Remco van Wijk
Rochus Westbroek

Head Coach Roelant Oltmans

Oriol Alcarez
Jaime Amat
Javier Arnau
Jordi Arnau
Óscar Barrena
Juan Dinarés
Juan Escarré
Javier Escudé
Juantxo García-Mauriño
Antonio González (gk)
Antonio Iglesias
Ramón Jufresa (gk)
Joaquim Malgosa (c)
Victor Pujol
Ramón Sala
Pablo Usoz

Head Coach Toni Forrellat

Umpires

Round robin
Friday January 19, 1996

Saturday January 20, 1996

Sunday January 21, 1996

Monday January 22, 1996

Wednesday January 24, 1996

Thursday January 25, 1996

Saturday January 27, 1996

Sunday January 28, 1996

Final rankings

Remarks
 The first five (Netherlands, India, Great Britain, Spain, and Malaysia) qualified for this year's Summer Olympics in Atlanta, Georgia.

Topscorers

See also
1995 Women's Field Hockey Olympic Qualifier

Q
Hockey, men's qualifier
Field hockey at the Summer Olympics – Men's qualification tournaments
1996
Qualification for the 1996 Summer Olympics